Seng Mountain National Scenic Area is a federally designated National Scenic Area within Mount Rogers National Recreation Area in Smyth County, Virginia, USA. The  scenic area is administered by the U.S. Forest Service as part of Jefferson National Forest. Mountains and ridges within the scenic area include Seng Mountain, Chestnut Ridge, Round Top, Double Top and Chestnut Ridge, all portions of the Iron Mountain system within the upper drainage of the South Fork of the Holston River. The scenic area includes Rowland Creek Falls, a campground and a picnic area. 

The National Scenic Area was established by Public Law 111-11, the Omnibus Public Land Management Act of 2009. 

The area is part of the Mount Rogers Cluster.

References

External links
 Map of proposed National Scenic Area and Wilderness 

George Washington and Jefferson National Forests
National scenic areas
Protected areas of Virginia
Protected areas established in 2009